George Samuel Drissell (born 20 January 1999) is an English cricketer. He made his first-class debut for Gloucestershire in the 2017 County Championship on 6 August 2017. He made his List A debut for Gloucestershire in the 2018 Royal London One-Day Cup on 6 June 2018.

Drissell was released by Gloucestershire in September 2020. He subsequently joined Somerset for the 2021 One-Day Cup, playing five matches in the tournament. He signed a contract with Durham in November 2021, having played in the club's second XI in September. He made his Twenty20 debut on 29 May 2022, for Durham in the 2022 T20 Blast.

References

External links
 

1999 births
Living people
English cricketers
Gloucestershire cricketers
Somerset cricketers
Durham cricketers
Cricketers from Bristol